John Lee may refer to:

Academia 
 John Lee (astronomer) (1783–1866), president of the Royal Astronomical Society
 John Lee (university principal) (1779–1859), University of Edinburgh principal
 John Lee (pathologist) (born 1961), English
 John Lee (political scientist) (born 1973), Australian
 John Alan Lee (1933–2013), Canadian sociologist and LGBT activist
 John M. Lee (born 1950), American mathematician
 John Ning-Yuean Lee (born 1945), Taiwanese biologist
 J. R. E. Lee (John Robert Edward Lee Sr., 1864–1944), president of Florida A&M University

Entertainment
 John Lee (British actor) (1725–1781), British actor
 John Lee (Australian actor) (1928–2000), Australian television actor
 John Lee (artist), British Pre-Raphaelite artist
 John Lee (author) (born 1931), American thriller writer
 John Lee (bassist) (born 1952), American bassist, producer, recording engineer
 John Lee (blues musician) (1915–1977), American country blues guitarist, pianist, singer and songwriter
 John Lee (producer) (born 1972), co-creator of MTV2 comedy show Wonder Showzen
 John B. Lee (born 1951), Canadian poet
 John H. Lee (director) (born 1971), South Korean director
 John H. Lee (musician) (1847–1890), American banjoist, composer and author
 John Rafter Lee, British actor, voice actor, and audio book narrator
 John Lee (born 1973), also known as John Threat, alias Corrupt, American computer hacker and filmmaker

Politics

U.S.
 John Lee (California politician) (born 1970), Los Angeles City Council member for district 12
 John Lee (Maryland politician) (1788–1871), Maryland representative in the 18th United States Congress
 John C. Lee (1828–1891), Ohio lieutenant governor, 1868–1872
 John Constable Lee, American planters and Virginia politician
 John Edwin Lee, member of the Mississippi House of Representatives
 John Jay Lee (born 1955), mayor of North Las Vegas
 John L. G. Lee (1869–1952), member and speaker of the Maryland House of Delegates
 John Z. Lee (born 1968), United States federal judge

U.K.
 John Lee (1695–1761), British Member of Parliament for Newport and Malmesbury
 John Lee (Attorney-General) (1733–1793), Attorney-General for England and Wales, 1783, British MP for Higham Ferrers and Clitheroe
 John Lee Lee (1802–1874), British Member of Parliament for Wells
 John Lee (Labour politician) (1927–2020), Labour Party Member of Parliament for Reading
 John Lee, Baron Lee of Trafford (born 1942), former Minister and Conservative Member of Parliament for Pendle
 John Joseph Lee (born 1942), Irish historian, former senator and professor
 John Lee (by 1491-1542 or later), MP for Cumberland in 1529
 John Lee (by 1526-60 or later), MP for Cumberland in 1554
 John Lee (died 1558), MP for Sandwich
 John Lee (MP for New Woodstock) (c. 1535-c. 1603), MP for New Woodstock

Elsewhere
 John Lee (Australian politician) (1885–1957), New South Wales state politician
 John Lee (Canadian politician) (1845–1915), politician in Ontario, Canada
 John A. Lee (1891–1982), New Zealand politician
 John Lee Ka-chiu (born 1957), Chief Executive of Hong Kong and former police officer 
 John Lee (bureaucrat) (born 1964), Australian bureaucrat

Sports

American football
 John Lee (defensive lineman) (born 1953), American football player
 John Lee (placekicker) (born 1964), Korean player of American football
 John P. Lee, American college football coach from 1891 to 1893

Other sports
 John Lee (cricketer) (1825–1903), English clergyman and cricketer
 John Lee (footballer, born 1869) (1869–?), English footballer
 John Lee (footballer, born 1889) (1889–?), English footballer
 John Lee (rower) (born 1948), Australian Olympic rower
 John Lee (hurler) (born 1986), plays for the Galway senior hurling team
 John W. Lee, British middle-distance runner
 John Lee, racing driver in 1991 British Formula Three season and 1992 British Formula Three season
 John Lee (ice dancer), partner of Naomi Lang at the 1995 U.S. Figure Skating Championships

Other 
 John Lee (inventor), 19th century Scottish-Canadian inventor and arms designer
 John Lee (trade unionist) (died 1963), British trade union leader
 John Lee (priest), English Anglican priest
 John Babbacombe Lee (1864–1945), English convicted murderer noted for surviving three attempts to hang him
 John Black Lee (1924–2016), American architect
 John C. H. Lee (1887–1958), US Army lieutenant general
 John D. Lee (1812–1877), Mormon leader executed for his part in the Mountain Meadows Massacre
 John F. Lee (1813–1884), US Army Judge Advocate General 1849-1862 and cousin of Robert E. Lee

See also
 Jon Lee (disambiguation)
 Jonathan Lee (disambiguation)
 Johnny Lee (disambiguation)
 Jack Lee (disambiguation)
 John Lea (disambiguation)
 John Leigh (disambiguation)